Louise Currie (born Louise Gunter; April 7, 1913 – September 8, 2013) was an American film actress, active from 1940 into the early 1950s.

Biography

Currie was born in Oklahoma City, Oklahoma, the daughter of Charles W. Gunter, a banker, and his wife, Louise (née Currie), whose maiden name she would take for her professional acting surname. She was prominent in society. While attending the Martha Washington Seminary, a finishing school for young women in Washington, D.C., she was chosen one of the ten most beautiful society girls in the nation's capital. She attended Sarah Lawrence College in New York, where she became interested in acting. She moved to Hollywood, California  and attended Max Reinhardt's drama school, where she was spotted by talent scouts  while taking part in the school's stage workshop. She declined to attempt screen tests until after graduation.

With the help of her agent, Sue Carol, wife to actor Alan Ladd, she began working with Monogram Pictures and Columbia Pictures. Most of her movies were B-movies and serials, in which she often portrayed the heroine. Her film career began in 1940, when she appeared first in Billy the Kid Outlawed and then as a society debutante, in the Kay Kyser musical You'll Find Out. In 1941 she starred in the serial Adventures of Captain Marvel opposite Tom Tyler.

Currie had an uncredited role in Citizen Kane (1941), as a reporter at Xanadu. She was the last surviving Kane cast member.

From 1940–49 she had roles in 39 films, many of which were starring, including The Masked Marvel (1943). She made a few television appearances in the 1950s, retiring permanently from acting in 1956.

Personal life
Currie was first married to Robert A. Hefner Jr., but that marriage ended in divorce January 29, 1940. She married actor John Whitney (1918-1985) at the peak of her career, but the marriage ended in divorce. On May 4, 1948, she married character actor John Good. He retired from acting, and the two opened a successful antique import-export business in Beverly Hills, remaining together until his death in December 1996.

Other
In 1944, Currie had starred opposite Hollywood legend Bela Lugosi in The Ape Man (1943) and Voodoo Man (1944). Along with actress Lucille Lund and others, she took part in the documentary film Lugosi: Hollywood's Dracula (1997), which detailed the life and acting career of Lugosi. In 2002, she married Grover Asmus, widower of actress Donna Reed. 

On May 17, 2010, Currie appeared at the Academy of Motion Picture Arts and Sciences in Beverly Hills to introduce a screening of a restored print of the first chapter of the 1941 serial, Adventures of Captain Marvel. She made repeat appearances on May 24, 2010 and August 16, 2010.

Filmography

References

External links

1913 births
2013 deaths
Actresses from Oklahoma City
Sarah Lawrence College alumni
American film actresses
20th-century American actresses
American centenarians
Women centenarians
21st-century American women